Night Train to Paris is a 1964 British-American spy film starring Leslie Nielsen, Aliza Gur and Dorinda Stevens.

Plot
Former OSS officer Alan Holiday is visited by Catherine Carrel on New Year's Eve, Carrel says she's a close friend of Jules Lemoine also a former OSS officer who served with Holiday during the war.

Lemoine wants Holiday to go to Paris on a secret mission: to deliver a reel of tape, containing defense information, while Lemoine keeps a fake reel himself to deceive enemy agents. When Lemoine is killed and the fake tape stolen Holiday decides to go to Paris.

He poses as an assistant to photographer Louis Vernay, and they take three models along to further the ruse.

Cast
 Leslie Nielsen as Alan Holiday
 Aliza Gur as Catherine Carrel
 Dorinda Stevens as Olive Davies
 Eric Pohlmann as Krogh
 Edina Ronay as Julie
 André Maranne as Louis Vernay
 Cyril Raymond as Insp. Fleming
 Hugh Latimer as Jules Lemoine
 Jack Melford as PC inspector
 Simon Oates as Saunders
 Trevor Reid as Policeman on train
 Stanley Morgan as Plainclothesman
 Jenny White as Vernay's Model

Reviews
A review in The Film Daily 1964 vol. 125 had this to say "Night Train to Paris is a neat, little suspense film that will be a fine addition to any double bill. Its length probably automatically relegates it to second feature".

Howard Thompson, in The New York Times, disparaged the film: "Night Train to Paris — there's an intriguing title. But, believe us, this thumpingly mediocre little suspense melodrama that drifted into neighborhood theaters yesterday can go back to where it came from. There have been worse plots but few more familiar" and "starchy dialogue is neatly matched by Robert Douglas’s flat-footed direction". "The most attractive thing about the whole picture is a nifty blonde named Dorinda Stevens. The woman can act, too, which is more than can be said for most of the others".

References

External links
 
 
Night Train to Paris at TCMDB
Night Train to Paris at BFI
Review of film at New York Times

1964 films
1960s political thriller films
American spy thriller films
American black-and-white films
British spy thriller films
Films set in London
Films set in Paris
Films set around New Year
British political thriller films
Rail transport films
20th Century Fox films
Lippert Pictures films
1960s English-language films
1960s American films
1960s British films